Paucará is a town in Peru. It is the capital of the Paucara district in the Acobamba Province inside the Huancavelica Region.

According to the Peruvian 1993 census, it has a population of 1,886.

References 

Populated places in Peru